Kuramagomed Sharipovich  Kuramagomedov (born 21 March 1978) is a freestyle wrestler who competed for Russia in the 2004 Summer Olympics and won a world title in 1997 at 97 kg. He also represented Russia at the World Championships in 1998, where he won bronze at 97 kg.  From 2003 to 2005 he competed for Russia at 120 kg.  He won a silver medal at the 2005 World Championships.A five time European champion.

Notes

References
 Foeldeak Wrestling Database

1978 births
Living people
Olympic wrestlers of Russia
Wrestlers at the 2004 Summer Olympics
Sportspeople from Makhachkala
World Wrestling Championships medalists
World Wrestling Champions